Battai Bulldogok RK (also known as gas.hu Battai Bulldogok for sponsorship reasons) is a Hungarian rugby club in Százhalombatta. Their first team currently play in the Extraliga, while their second team, Fekete Sereg (Black Army), play in Nemzeti Bajnokság I.

History
The club was founded in January 1989 by Csaba Mátyás and among the founders were a number of former judo and canoeing internationals. They played their first match on 15 March 1989 when they took on the now-defunct Érdi Darazsak (Wasps of Érd). In their first full season they won promotion to Nemzeti Bajnokság I, only to be relegated back to Nemzeti Bajnokság II.

Honours
 Nemzeti Bajnokság I 
 1997, 2009, 2010
 Nemzeti Bajnokság II 
 1990, 1992
 Hungarian Cup
 1997

Current squad

References

External links
  Battai Bulldogok RK

Hungarian rugby union teams
Rugby clubs established in 1989